The Headies Award for Hip Hop World Revelation of the Year is an award presented at The Headies, a ceremony that was established in 2006 and originally called the Hip Hop World Awards. It was first presented to Soul E in 2006.

Recipients

Notes

References

The Headies